The Carnatic Treaty was signed on 26 July 1801. It is a treaty between the Nawab of Arcot and the East India Company. It is one of the treaties by which the British Empire acquired its rule over the Indian subcontinent or British India. The treaty entailed that the Nawab was to cede the districts of North Arcot, South Arcot, Tiruchirappalli, Madurai and Tirunelveli to the Company, and transfer all the administrative powers to it.

Background 

The treaty resulted in the liquidation of all the local chieftains of Tamil Nadu and The East India Company assumed direct control over Tamilagam. The Palayakkarar system came to an end as they had to demolish all forts and disband their armies. It resulted in the Company having full command over the region.

Consequences 

Based on the terms of the treaty, the Nawab of Arcot (sometimes called the Nawab of the Carnatic) ceded all his lands to British rule, including the territory of the polygars. He was retained one-fifth of the revenues of the country, amounting to 12 lakhs p.a in exchange.

See also 
 Carnatic Wars
 Treaty of Pondicherry
 Treaty of Seringapatam

Literature

References

External links
Tamilnation.org

Treaties of the British East India Company
1801 in British India
1801 treaties
Treaties of the Nawab of the Carnatic
July 1801 events